Songs of Praise is the debut studio album by punk band the Adicts. It was released in 1981 on Dwed Wecords. It was re-released by Fall Out Records. A 1993 CD reissue by Cleopatra Records included two bonus tracks from the Bar Room Bop EP. In 2008, the album was rerecorded by the band and released as the "25th Anniversary Edition."

Critical reception
The Encyclopedia of Popular Music called the album "something of a cult classic in punk record-collecting circles."

Track listing 
All songs written by Keith Warren and Pete Davison. 
 "England"
 "Hurt"
 "Just Like Me"
 "Tango"
 "Telepathic People"
 "Mary Whitehouse"
 "Distortion"
 "Get Adicted"
 "Viva la Revolution"
 "Calling Calling"
 "In the Background"
 "Dynasty"
 "Peculiar Music"
 "Numbers"
 "Sensitive"
 "Songs of Praise"

1993 Cleopatra bonus tracks
 "Sound of Music"
 "Who Spilt My Beer?"

Personnel

The Adicts
 Monkey - vocals
 Pete Dee - guitar  
 Mel Ellis - bass
 Kid Dee - drums

Release history

References

The Adicts albums
1981 debut albums
Cleopatra Records albums